This is a list of works by artist Herschel C. Logan.

Most of Logan's prints had a consistent title corresponding to his own typed inventories and usually found on the prints. But variations do exist across copies, and some prints had limited copies with no explicit title. Museums, galleries and auction houses can often provide a working title. Alternate titles can also arise when a print is published in another context. For instance, reproductions used in Logan's own book "Other Days in Pictures and Verse" have descriptive titles that apply to the print and verse together. Such assigned/alternative titles are indicated by a parenthesized name, with "also known as" shown as "aka".

Key to online images

Woodcuts

Etchings, Lithographs and Linocuts

Commercial Works
Logan contributed a great deal in design, decoration and illustration to his work at Consolidated Printing. The firm published historical and inspirational books illustrated by Logan, as well as advertising cards and calendars of famous Americans as drawn by him. Some stand alone as singular works. Examples:

Books (as author and/or illustrator)

Articles

References

Lists of works of art